Enosis Kokkinotrimithia is a Cypriot football club based in Kokkinotrimithia. Founded in 1968, was playing sometimes in Second and sometimes in the Third and Fourth Division.

References

Football clubs in Cyprus
Association football clubs established in 1968
1968 establishments in Cyprus